The  is an archaeological site with the ruins of a Hakuhō period Buddhist temple in the Ganshoji, Ichogi neighborhood of the  town of Mima, Tokushima Prefecture Japan. Its ruins were designated as a National Historic Site in 1976, with the area under protection extended in 1997. It is the oldest known Buddhist temple ruin in Tokushima Prefecture.

History
The Kōzato temple ruins are located is located on the alluvial plain of the north bank of the middle reaches of the Yoshino River. A large-scale archaeological excavation in 1967 found the foundation stones for the   Kondō and Pagoda. From traces of a surrounding earthen palisade and moat, the temple compound was found to occupy an area 94 meters east-to-west by 120 meters north-to-south. The layout of the temple appears to be patterned after Hokki-ji in Ikaruga, Nara, with the Kondō  on the right and the Pagoda on the left. The Pagoda foundations included an irregular octagonal stone with a diameter of over a meter, with a 13-centimeter center hole for the pagoda's main spar. 

In addition to roof tiles, small pieces of bronze, Haji pottery, Sue pottery, and wooden tally boards have also been excavated from the temple area. There are plans to preserve the ruins as an archaeological park. The excavated roof tiles and other artifacts are stored and exhibited at the Mima Folk Museum and Tokushima Prefectural Museum, located on the precincts of Gansho-ji temple, about 300 meters from the site. 

The site is a five-minute walk from the  "Teramachi"  bus stop on the municipal bus Sadamitsu Station on the JR Tokushima Line.

See also
List of Historic Sites of Japan (Tokushima)

References

External links

Mima Town home page
Tokushima Prefecture home page

Buddhist temples in Tokushima Prefecture
Historic Sites of Japan
Mima, Tokushima
Awa Province (Tokushima)
Buddhism in the Asuka period
Buddhist archaeological sites in Japan